"Joy" is a 1983 single released by Marvin Gaye, the final single issued from his Midnight Love album. The song, which was built around a funk vibe, was inspired by Gaye's religious background, which had also inspired songs such as "God is Love", "Everybody Needs Love" and "Praise". Gaye introduced the song as a tribute to his father during his 1983 concert tour.

It was also the final single released before Gaye's death in 1984.

Track listing
7" single
"Joy"  – 3:55
"Turn On Some Music"  – 5:08

12" single
"Joy" (Parts 1 & 2) (Special Extended Remix) – 6:40
"Turn On Some Music"  – 5:08

Credits
All vocals by Marvin Gaye
Instrumentation by:
Marvin Gaye: drums, Fender Rhodes, synthesizers, bass synthesizers
Gordon Banks: guitars, bass
Bobby Stern: tenor saxophone solo

Chart performance
The song peaked at number seventy-eight on the Billboard R&B singles chart, and was the last single Gaye released while alive. Three later posthumous releases would reach the Billboard Top 40 over the next twenty years.

References

External links
 

1983 singles
Marvin Gaye songs
Songs written by Marvin Gaye
Song recordings produced by Marvin Gaye
1983 songs
Columbia Records singles